Cossham Memorial Hospital is a community hospital, founded in 1907, in Hillfields, Bristol, near Kingswood, South Gloucestershire, England.

History
The hospital was built by Frederick Bligh Bond in a Queen Anne style between 1905 and 1907, as a memorial to Handel Cossham, a former MP and Mayor of Bath who died in 1890. Sited on Lodge Hill, the clock tower is the highest point in Bristol and can be seen for miles around. It has been designated by English Heritage as a grade II listed building. Major renovation work was carried out at the hospital, finishing in 2012.

Services
The services provided by North Bristol NHS Trust at Cossham include outpatients for various specialties and physiotherapy services.

Archives
Records of the Cossham Memorial Hospital are held at Bristol Archives (Ref. 41171).

See also
 Grade II listed buildings in Bristol
List of hospitals in England

References

External links

A Short History of Cossham, its Hospital & Medical Society, Cossham Medical Society, 2006

Hospital buildings completed in 1907
Grade II listed buildings in Bristol
NHS hospitals in England
Hospitals in Bristol
Grade II listed hospital buildings